John Joseph Connolly  (October 31, 1906 – July 25, 1982) was a Canadian parliamentarian.

Born in Ottawa, Ontario, he graduated from the University of Ottawa in 1927. He received a Doctorate of Philosophy from the University of Notre Dame and also taught at the university for a period. He studied law at Université de Montréal and was called to the Quebec bar and the Ontario bar. He was a Queen's Counsel.

During World War II, he was the executive assistant to Angus Lewis Macdonald, Minister of National Defence for Naval Services. In 1944, he played a pivotal role in the dismissal of Vice-Admiral Percy W. Nelles, the highest-ranking officer in the Royal Canadian Navy.
 He was made an Officer of the Order of the British Empire for his work during the war.

A law professor, Connolly was appointed to the Senate of Canada as a Liberal by Prime Minister Louis St. Laurent on June 12, 1953. From 1961 to 1964 he served as the federal party's president. In 1964, he was appointed to the Cabinet by Lester Pearson becoming Leader of the Government in the Canadian Senate and Minister without portfolio. He served as government leader until 1968 when Pearson retired and remained a Senator until his own retirement in 1981.

References

External links 
 
 John Joseph Connoly fonds (R3806) at Library and Archives Canada

1906 births
1982 deaths
Lawyers in Ontario
Canadian legal scholars
Canadian senators from Ontario
Liberal Party of Canada senators
Members of the King's Privy Council for Canada
Canadian Officers of the Order of the British Empire
Politicians from Ottawa
University of Notre Dame alumni
University of Ottawa alumni
20th-century Canadian lawyers
Canadian King's Counsel